Hun-Saare or Duka is a Kainji language of Nigeria. The eastern and western dialects are known as Hun (Ut-Hun) and Saare (Us-Saare), but speakers use Saare for both.

References

Further reading
Sociolinguistic survey of the Duka (Hun-Saare) people

Northwest Kainji languages
Languages of Nigeria